Ernesto Gastaldi (born 10 September 1934) is an Italian screenwriter. Film historian and critic Tim Lucas described Gastaldi as the first Italian screenwriter to specialize in horror and thriller films. Gastaldi worked within several popular genres including pepla, Western and spy films.

Biography
Ernesto Gastaldi was born on 10 September 1934 in Graglia in the province of Province of Biella, Piedmont. Gastaldi left his job as a clerk at the Sella bank in Biella to move to Rome where he was admitted into Centro Sperimentale di Cinematografia. After graduating, Gastaldi had trouble finding work. In 1957, Gastaldi wrote his first science fiction novel which the publishers requested an English-language name for the cover. Gastaldi was sharing an apartment at the time with an Anglo-Italian man named Julian Birri, who he adapted his name for his alias Julian Berry. Gastaldi would write more crime and science fiction novels during this period such as Sangue intasca (1957) as James Duffy, Brivido sulla schiena (1957) as Freddy Foster and Tempo zero (1960) as Berry.

Gastaldi's debut as a screenwriter and assistant director was with the film The Vampire and the Ballerina by Renato Polselli. Gastaldi reflected on writing the film by stating that his working hours were from 8 in the morning until midnight, stating that "if someone had told me I was making a Gothic film I would have laughed." Other works in gothic horror included Gastaldi writing for Werewolf in a Girls' Dormitory, The Horrible Dr. Hichcock and The Whip and the Body. Following his gothic works, was his work in giallo film, where Gastaldi directed films such as Libido, which was released in 1965.

Selected filmography

Footnotes

References

External links

1934 births
Living people
People from Graglia
Italian male screenwriters
Italian screenwriters
Giallo film directors
Italian film directors